Night of the Zombies (alternate title: Battalion of the Living Dead) is a 1981 American zombie horror war film directed by Joel M. Reed. The film was produced by Lorin E. Price. The film was distributed on VHS by InterGlobal Video Promotions Ltd.

Plot
During World War II, a United States Army chemical warfare battalion was rumored to have done battle against a Nazi Schutzstaffel (SS) unit somewhere in the Bavarian Alps. The two missing in action units were never heard from again. After thirty years, investigators searching for the soldiers' missing bodies look into rumors of soldiers that have turned into zombies.

When several of the investigators are found dead, the Central Intelligence Agency sends Special Agent Nick Monroe (James Gillis) in search of deserters from the missing Chemical Warfare unit. A top-secret nerve gas is discovered that has kept a battalion of flesh-eating World War II soldiers alive for decades. The nerve gas is known by the name Gamma 693, and was created to keep wounded soldiers alive, until they could be taken to a medical unit. Special Agent Nick Monroe uncovers a plot for world domination.

Cast

 Jamie Gillis as Nick Monroe
 Ryan Hilliard as Dr. Clarence Proud
 Ron Armstrong as Police Capt. Fleck
 Shoshana Ascher as a Prostitute
 Dick Carballo as Bearded Man at Bar
 Richard deFaut as Sgt. Freedman
 Alphonso DeNoble as Krieg – Camera-store Proprietor
 Samantha Grey as Susan Proud
 Juni Kulis as GRO Officer Schuller
 Robert Laconi as Bob Laconi

Production
Many scenes shot for the film were filmed in the home, and on the property of porn director Shaun Costello. The German city locations were filmed in Munich, Bavaria, West Germany. Other shots were filmed in New York. Filming for this film was done despite production problems relating to budget and permit authorization.

This low-budget, much-released horror film first saw the light as Gamma 693 in 1979, was resuscitated as Night of the Wehrmacht Zombies in 1981, and rose again in 1983 as Night of the Zombies. The film was also released under the titles Curse of the Ghoul Battalions, Die Nacht Der Zombies, Sister of Death, Battalion of the Living Dead, Zombie War Games and The Chilling.

Release
The film was released in theaters on June 1, 1981. The film was later released on VHS tape in Toronto, Canada by InterGlobal Video Promotions Ltd.

Further reading

 Book of the Dead: The Complete History of Zombie Cinema by Jamie Russell, FAB (2005)

See also
 List of zombie Nazi films

References

External links
 

1981 films
1981 horror films
1980s war films
Nazi zombie films
American zombie films
Films about chemical war and weapons
Films about the Central Intelligence Agency
Films about the United States Army
Films directed by Joel M. Reed
Films set in the Alps
Films set in Bavaria
Films shot in Munich
Films shot in New York (state)
Western Front of World War II films
Horror war films
1980s English-language films
1980s American films